Belmond Andean Explorer, launched in May 2017, is South America's first luxury sleeper train. It replaces the eponymous Pullman day train, between Cusco and Puno, at Lake Titicaca. By the new train this trip is converted to a one-night journey, and extended from Puno for another overnight ride to Arequipa.

It then continues to Arequipa, a city with a UNESCO World Heritage Site centre, stopping en route at Sumbay Caves. It is possible to add on a visit to the Colca Canyon, known for its condors.

The trainset used to serve as the Great South Pacific Express in Australia between 1999 and 2003. The since-mothballed carriages were shipped to Peru in February 2016, where they were refurbished. The three accommodation levels of the GSPE with double, twin and bunk beds - all of them with en-suite bathroom - has been kept, as well as the two dining and bar cars, and the last car having an open-air observation deck.

Belmond Andean Explorer is owned by PeruRail, and is a 50%/50% joint venture between Belmond and Peruvian investor Lorenzo Sousa, founder and chairman of the board of PeruRail SA. It will be operated by PeruRail, which also has the Hiram Bingham Pullman train from Cusco to Machu Picchu.

Belmond Andean Explorer Cars

(Belmond Andean Explorer cars retained their original Australian numbers.  However, Southern Peru-related car names were added.)

References

Railway services introduced in 2017
Named passenger trains
Passenger rail transport in Peru

External Web Sites
 Belmond Andean Explorer